Nathalie Katia Boy de la Tour (Szenberg; born 19 August 1968) is a French football executive. She has been president of the Ligue de Football Professionnel since 11 November 2016.

Biography
Boy de la Tour graduated with a master's degree from ESCP Europe in 1991.  She later worked for consultancy firm Bossard Gemini and advertising agency BBDO.  In July 2013, she became the first female member of the administrative council of the Ligue de Football Professionnel (LFP). In November 2016, she was elected president by the LFP's general assembly, defeating the council's nominee Raymond Domenech.

Honours
Orders
Chevalier of the Ordre national du Mérite: 2011

References

External links
 

1968 births
Living people
Association football executives
Women chief executives
Knights of the Ordre national du Mérite